Susan French Moultrie (January 23, 1912 – April 6, 2003) was an American stage, television, and film actress.

Early years
Born in Los Angeles, French was the daughter of Lloyd Moultrie, a show-business lawyer. She was a graduate of the American Academy of Dramatic Arts.

Career
Early in her career, French appeared in two Broadway plays, worked in radio, and was a photographic stylist for three national magazines. She and her sister worked as riveters for Douglas Aircraft during World War II, and she helped start a theater group there.

French appeared in the TV movie People Like Us (1990). She also played the roles of Mrs. Shaw in the 1979 TV movie Captain America II: Death Too Soon, and Bessie Gilmore in The Executioner's Song (1982).  French acted in the soap opera Bare Essence (1982–1983) and appeared in episodes of The Alfred Hitchcock Hour, Dallas, Falcon Crest, The Colbys, L.A. Law, Little House on the Prairie, Moonlighting, Quantum Leap, Perfect Strangers, and Star Trek: The Next Generation. Her final television appearance was in an episode of Picket Fences. In addition, she had a recurring role on the CBS TV series Cagney & Lacey as Mrs. Skimmins.

French also appeared in Universal's 1980 film Somewhere in Time, starring Christopher Reeve and Jane Seymour. Her other film credits include The Impossible Years (1968), Jaws 2 (1978), House (1985), The Verne Miller Story (1987), Flatliners (1990) and Younger and Younger (1993).

Her last film role was in the live-action version of Fist of the North Star (1995). She also played the main character in an episode of Remington Steele.

She had for many years a puppet theater in her home in Santa Monica, California and in 1964 published a book about making marionettes, Presenting Marionettes published by Art Horizons in hardcover.

Death
French died in 2003 of natural causes in Santa Monica, California, aged 91.

Filmography

References

External links
 

1912 births
2003 deaths
20th-century American actresses
Actresses from California
American puppeteers
American film actresses
American stage actresses
American television actresses
21st-century American women